ATM25 is an ATM (Asynchronous Transfer Mode) version wherein data is transferred at 25.6 Mbit/s over Category 3 cable. ATM25 has no particular distinctions from other ATM versions. However, ATM25 chipsets are inexpensive in comparison to faster ATM chipsets, having the result of making ATM technology available for small office/home office environments. However, these networks no longer have much potential for expansion, as Ethernet has become the first choice in this domain.

The WAN connection side of ATM25 systems often takes place over a fast DSL variant such as RADSL. DSL is often considered in this case, as its technology is based on an ATM core.

In March 2001, Network World article put it this way:
Classified mostly as a solution looking for a problem, 25M bit/sec ATM to the desktop failed before it really got rolling. While many folks thought the idea of providing all that bandwidth to user PCs was worthwhile, the idea of paying twice as much for the luxury compared with switched Ethernet didn't fly.

References

Networking standards